Canada Country is a chart published weekly by Billboard magazine. The chart was published from July 22, 2006, onwards. This 50-position chart lists the most popular country music songs, calculated weekly by airplay on 31 country music stations across the country as monitored by Nielsen BDS. Songs are ranked by total plays. As with most other Billboard charts, the Canada Country chart features a rule for when a song enters recurrent rotation. A song is declared recurrent if it has been on the chart longer than 30 weeks and is lower than number 20 in rank.

Prior to the current chart published by Billboard, an airplay chart following a similar methodology was published by Radio & Records. The R&R Canada Country Top 30 chart listed the most popular songs on country radio based on airplay from 21 Mediabase stations. The list was expanded to 40 positions effective as of the May 19, 2006 issue. The Radio & Records chart featured a rule whereby any song below rank 15 that has been on the chart 20 or more weeks will be moved to recurrent rotation.

These are the Canadian number-one country singles of 2006, per the BDS Canada Country Airplay chart and R&R Canada Country Top 30 chart.

Note that Billboard publishes charts with an issue date approximately 7–10 days in advance.

R&R Canada Country

Billboard Canada Country

See also
2006 in music
List of number-one country singles of 2006 (U.S.)

Notes

References

External links
Current Billboard Canada Country chart

2006
Number-one country singles
Canada Country